Marathon Aerodrome  is located  northeast of Marathon, Ontario, Canada.

References

External links

Registered aerodromes in Ontario
Transport in Thunder Bay District